Louis Marcel Richardet (17 May 1864 – 14 January 1923 in Geneva) was a Swiss sports shooter who competed in the early 20th century. He participated in Shooting at the 1900 Summer Olympics in Paris and won two gold medals with the Military pistol and rifle teams for Switzerland.

References

External links
 

1864 births
1923 deaths
Swiss male sport shooters
ISSF pistol shooters
Olympic shooters of Switzerland
Olympic gold medalists for Switzerland
Olympic medalists in shooting
Medalists at the 1900 Summer Olympics
Medalists at the 1906 Intercalated Games
Shooters at the 1900 Summer Olympics
Shooters at the 1906 Intercalated Games
Place of birth missing